Travis Jon Fulton (May 29, 1977 – July 10, 2021) was an American mixed martial artist and a professional boxer in the heavyweight division of both sports. Known as a longtime veteran in mixed martial arts, he competed in over 300 sanctioned bouts and while he was perhaps best known for competing in smaller US-based promotions, he also competed in the UFC, the USWF, the WEC, Pancrase, M-1 Global, the Chicago Red Bears of the IFL, King of the Cage, RINGS, and Oktagon MMA. He also holds the record for the most sanctioned mixed martial arts bouts, with 320 bouts; in addition to that, he also holds the most wins in mixed martial arts history (255).

Background
Fulton was born in Waterloo, Iowa and raised in Cedar Falls, Iowa. His father worked for the John Deere company and was eventually laid off, sending the family to deep poverty. In school, Fulton was seriously bullied, up to a point where he contrived a plan to kill his tormentors and subsequently himself. However, success in multiple sports made him popular: Fulton began wrestling when he was in elementary school, following his older brother's footsteps. Fulton was also a skilled baseball player and later attended Cedar Falls High School, where he was a state competitor in wrestling, but was kicked off the team several times for skipping classes. He was also a Golden Gloves boxer and a second-degree black belt in American Kenpo. Fulton fell in love with the sport of mixed martial arts after seeing UFC 3 on pay per view. At the age of 18, Fulton took up submission fighting and later trained with Miletich Fighting Systems led by legendary coach and fellow Iowa native Pat Miletich.

Mixed martial arts career
Fulton has fought more documented MMA matches than any other fighter, racking up over 300 fights in just over 15 years. He debuted on July 26, 1996, when he was 19 years old against Dave Strasser in an event entitled "Gladiators". He lost by submission via a rear naked choke. Within just over two years of his debut, he had fought 50 Vale Tudo fights including five fights across two tournaments in one month in September 1997, compiling a record of 37-11-2 in that span.  He won the World Vale Tudo Heavyweight Championship at a Tournament in Brazil in 1998.

Fulton fought over 40 professional mixed martial Arts bouts in 1998 alone. He won 10 tournaments including the prestigious WVC in Brazil.

Fulton also defeated undefeated Super Brawl champion Kawika Pa'alhui in Hawaii in August 1998. He fought to a draw against Ikuhisa Minowa in Japan in October 1998.

By early 1999, at just 22 years old, Fulton was recognized as one of the top young Vale Tudo fighters in the United States and was invited to fight at UFC 20, where he lost to Pete Williams by submission via an armbar. He returned at UFC 21, defeating David Dodd via a unanimous decision, though it was his last time fighting in the UFC.

Fulton was scheduled to compete in UFC 23 against Scott Adams, but was sidelined with a broken hand just six days prior to the event.

In 2008, Fulton was chosen to appear in The Ultimate Fighter reality series, but was unable to make weight in time for filming.

While posting a winning record 2001-05 were dogged by losses to up-and-coming fighters that went on to become top-level UFC fighters, such as Andrei Arlovski, Renato Sobral, Ricco Rodriguez, Evan Tanner, Dan Severn, Rich Franklin, Forrest Griffin, Ian Freeman, Jeremy Horn, Branden Lee Hinkle, and Ben Rothwell.

Fulton has thrived in many MMA organizations. He won the International Fighting Championships (IFC) world title 3 times, and has also won 3 tournaments in the organization. His only IFC losses were to Matt Lindland by choke at 22:13 (although Fulton submitted Lindland via armbar submission less than 2 minutes into their fight, but Lindland protested and Fulton agreed to continue the match) and Vladimir Matyushenko by neck crank at 15:33.

Fulton competed in the main event of World Extreme Cagefighting's debut event in June 2001 and lost a decision to UFC Hall of Famer Dan Severn.

Fulton returned to compete in IFL Chicago in May 2007 when he took on IFL Heavyweight Champion Ben Rothwell. Fulton took the fight on a week's notice, but gave Rothwell his greatest challenge to date in the IFL organization before losing via kimura in round 2.

Fulton fought former UFC Heavyweight Champion Andrei Arlovski at ProElite 2 in November 2011 and lost via a head kick KO with only one second remaining in the fight. The bout served as the co-main event.

Fulton was the #1 ranked heavyweight in Iowa for nearly a decade. He formerly held the Iowa Challenge, Cedar Valley Fighting Championships, and ISKA Mid West Muay Thai Heavyweight Championship titles.

On April 4, 2019, in Fulton's last fight, he captured the M-1 Global Super Fight World title when he defeated Shannon Ritch in Winterhaven, California by forearm choke. Fulton holds the record for the most mixed martial arts fights in history. Shannon Ritch is second only to Fulton in number of mixed martial arts fights.

ISCF - International Sport Combat Federation
Fulton won the ISCF Pro Super Heavyweight United States Title on August 8, 1999, in Tempe, Arizona, when he defeated Dan Chase by knockout at :40 of round 1.

Iowa Challenge
In August 2012, Fulton competed at Iowa Challenge 69, facing Brad Scholten. He won the fight via split decision. After being inactive from MMA, Fulton returned to face Ryan Scheeper at Iowa Challenge 80 in March 2013, which he won by submission strikes. Fulton returned to Iowa Challenge in August 2013, where he faced Blake Breitspreacher, and won by TKO.

Boxing career
In parallel to his MMA career, Fulton has also boxed professionally since 1999, mainly in the Midwestern circuit, often serving as a trial horse for up-and coming fighters such as Tye Fields, Chris Koval, Brian Minto, David Rodriguez, Albert Sosnowski, Chauncy Welliver, Travis Walker, Alonzo Butler, and Steve Collins (not the famous Irish boxer). While not as prolific as his MMA career, he has had 75 professional boxing matches, racking up a record of 25 wins against 48 losses and 2 draws, with twenty-three of his wins coming by way of knockout.

Personal life
Fulton lived alone in rural Iowa and had one daughter and had second, much younger child with a different woman, he was paying child support on. He wrote his autobiography in 2017 which has not been published.

Federal child pornography charges
On February 17, 2021, Fulton was charged with possession of child pornography, as well as the sexual exploitation of a child. Per the charging document, Fulton had attempted to get a minor under the age of 18 to "engage in sexually explicit conduct for the purpose of producing visual depictions of such conduct" and was also accused of receiving and attempting to receive child pornography via "interstate and foreign commerce". He was alleged to have possessed and attempted to possess child pornography through a USB drive transported across state lines between November 2018 and November 2020. If convicted, Fulton would have faced up to 70 years in prison. According to court records, Fulton made his first court appearance on February 19 with the United States District Court for the Northern District of Iowa in Cedar Rapids. He pleaded not guilty to one count of sexual exploitation of a child, one count of possession of child pornography, and one count of receipt of child pornography.

Death
While in custody for the child pornography charges, Fulton, age 44, was found dead by deputies at the Linn County Jail on the morning of July 10, 2021. The cause of death was suicide by hanging. An investigation into his death is underway, with an autopsy still pending.

Championships and accomplishments
M-1 Global 
M-1 Global Super Fight World Champion 
International Sport Combat Federation 
ISCF Pro Super Heavyweight US Champion 
International Fighting Championship
IFC 8 Tournament Winner
IFC Extreme Combat Tournament Winner
IFC 6 Tournament Runner Up
World Vale Tudo Championship
WVC 6 Tournament Winner

Mixed martial arts record

|-
| Win
| align=center|255–54–10 (1)
| Shannon Ritch
| Submission (forearm choke)
| M-1 Global: Road to M-1 USA 2
| 
| align=center| 2
| align=center| 0:41
| Winterhaven, California, United States
|  
|-
| Win
| align=center| 254–54–10 (1)
| Johnathan Ivey
| TKO (retirement)
| Colosseum Combat 45
| 
| align=center| 1
| align=center| 3:50
| Kokomo, Indiana, United States
|
|-
| Loss
| align=center| 253–54–10 (1)
| Attila Végh
| Submission (arm-triangle choke)
| Oktagon 4: Challenge Finals 2
| 
| align=center| 1
| align=center| 3:23
| Bratislava, Slovakia
|
|-
| Loss
| align=center| 253–53–10 (1)
| Sergey Spivak
| Submission (rear-naked choke)
| World Warriors Fighting Championship 7
| 
| align=center| 1
| align=center| 2:50
| Kyiv, Ukraine
| 
|-
| Loss
| align=center| 253–52–10 (1)
| Admir Bogucanin
| Submission (north-south choke)
| Superior Fighting Championship 16
| 
| align=center| 1
| align=center| 0:46
| Darmstadt, Hesse, Germany
|
|-
| Win
| align=center| 253–51–10 (1)
| Brad Scholten
| Decision (unanimous)
| VFC - Fight Night Waterloo
| 
| align=center| 3
| align=center| 5:00
| Waterloo, Iowa, United States
|
|-
| Win
| align=center| 252–51–10 (1)
| John Reed
| TKO (punches)
| Iowa Challenge 122
| 
| align=center| 1
| align=center| 0:48
| Waterloo, Iowa, United States
|
|-
| Loss
| align=center| 251–51–10 (1)
| Lechi Kurbanov
| TKO (doctor stoppage)
| WFCA 9 - Grozny Battle
| 
| align=center| 1
| align=center| 5:00
| Grozny, Russia
|
|-
| Loss
| align=center| 251–50–10 (1)
| Alexei Kudin
| TKO (punches)
| Russian MMA Union - New Horizons Grand Final
| 
| align=center| 1
| align=center| 1:34
| Minsk, Belarus
|
|-
| Win
| align=center| 251–49–10 (1)
| DaVonta Nunn
| Submission (armbar)
| Iowa Challenge 100
| 
| align=center| 1
| align=center| 1:01
| Waterloo, Iowa, United States
|
|-
| Win
| align=center| 250–49–10 (1)
| Blake Breitsprecher
| TKO (punches)
| Iowa Challenge 89
| 
| align=center| 1
| align=center| 1:39
| Waterloo, Iowa, United States
|
|-
| Win
| align=center| 249–49–10 (1)
| Ryan Scheeper
| TKO (Submission to punches)
| Iowa Challenge 80
| 
| align=center| 1
| align=center| 0:30
| Waterloo, Iowa, United States
| 
|-
| Win
| align=center| 248–49–10 (1)
| Brad Scholten
| Decision (split)
| Iowa Challenge 69
| 
| align=center| 3
| align=center| 5:00
| Waterloo, Iowa, United States
| 
|-
| Loss
| align=center| 247–49–10 (1)
| Andrei Arlovski
| KO (head kick)
| ProElite II: Big Guns
| 
| align=center| 3
| align=center| 4:59
| Moline, Illinois, United States
| 
|-
| Win
| align=center| 247–48–10 (1)
| Michael Smith
| KO (head kick)
| Iowa Challenge 63
| 
| align=center| 1
| align=center| 1:19
| Waterloo, Iowa, United States
| 
|-
| Win
| align=center| 246–48–10 (1)
| Jesse Nunez
| Submission (forearm choke)
| Iowa Challenge 63
| 
| align=center| 1
| align=center| 1:47
| Cedar Rapids, Iowa, United States
| 
|-
| Win
| align=center| 245–48–10 (1)
| John McElroy
| Submission (triangle choke)
| Iowa Challenge 63
| 
| align=center| 1
| align=center| 4:20
| Waterloo, Iowa, United States
| 
|-
| Win
| align=center| 244–48–10 (1)
| Waylon Goldsmith
| TKO (punches)
| Iowa Challenge 62
| 
| align=center| 1
| align=center| 0:27
| Waterloo, Iowa, United States
| 
|-
| Loss
| align=center| 243–48–10 (1)
| Jeff Monson
| Submission (kimura)
| Elite Promotions / Fight Time Promotions: Fight Time 2
| 
| align=center| 1
| align=center| 4:40
| Pompano Beach, Florida, United States
| 
|-
| Loss
| align=center| 243–47–10 (1)
| Justin Newcomb
| TKO (punches)
| Fury Fights
| 
| align=center| 1
| align=center| 1:11
| Watertown, South Dakota, United States
| 
|-
| Win
| align=center| 243–46–10 (1)
| Preston Shane
| KO (punches)
| TP: Calm Before the Storm
| 
| align=center| 2
| align=center| 0:57
| Waterloo, Iowa, United States
| 
|-
| Loss
| align=center| 242–46–10 (1)
| Ricco Rodriguez
| KO (head kick)
| Cage Thug
| 
| align=center| 1
| align=center| N/A
| Waterloo, Iowa, United States
| 
|-
| Win
| align=center| 242–45–10 (1)
| Brad Kohler
| KO (head kick)
| CFX / XKL: Mayhem in Minneapolis
| 
| align=center| 1
| align=center| 1:01
| Minneapolis, Minnesota, United States
| 
|-
| Win
| align=center| 241–45–10 (1)
| Blake Breitsprecher
| Submission (rear-naked choke)
| Cage Thug
| 
| align=center| 1
| align=center| 0:45
| Evansdale, Iowa, United States
| 
|-
| Win
| align=center| 240–45–10 (1)
| Bob Breshears
| Submission (armbar)
| Cage Thug
| 
| align=center| 2
| align=center| 0:30
| Cedar Rapids, Iowa, United States
| 
|-
| Win
| align=center| 239–45–10 (1)
| Anton Tomash
| KO (punch)
| CVFA: Friday Night Fights
| 
| align=center| 2
| align=center| 0:15
| Newton, Iowa, United States
| 
|-
| Win
| align=center| 238–45–10 (1)
| Anton Tomash
| Submission (armbar)
| Cage Thug
| 
| align=center| 1
| align=center| 2:50
| Union, Iowa, United States
| 
|-
| Win
| align=center| 237–45–10 (1)
| James Neely
| Submission (armbar)
| TP – Alabama Pride: Iowa vs. Alabama
| 
| align=center| 1
| align=center| N/A
| Pelham, Alabama, United States
| 
|-
| Win
| align=center| 236–45–10 (1)
| Matt Brenner
| KO (punches)
| CVFA: Amateur War Zone
| 
| align=center| 2
| align=center| 0:53
| Dubuque, Iowa, United States
| 
|-
| Win
| align=center| 235–45–10 (1)
| Anthony Clark
| KO (punches)
| CVFA: Rage in the Cage 2
| 
| align=center| 1
| align=center| 0:58
| Waterloo, Iowa, United States
| 
|-
| Win
| align=center| 234–45–10 (1)
| Jesse Nunez
| Submission (armbar)
| Cage Thug
| 
| align=center| 1
| align=center| 2:03
| Cedar Rapids, Iowa, United States
| 
|-
| Win
| align=center| 233–45–10 (1)
| Robert Casey
| KO (punches)
| Cage Thug
| 
| align=center| 2
| align=center| N/A
| West Union, Iowa, United States
| 
|-
| Win
| align=center| 232–45–10 (1)
| Willie Johnson
| TKO (retirement)
| Cage Thug
| 
| align=center| 2
| align=center| 3:00
| Waterloo, Iowa, United States
| 
|-
| Win
| align=center| 231–45–10 (1)
| Steven Morlock
| Submission (armbar)
| CVFA: Rage in the Cage
| 
| align=center| 2
| align=center| 1:40
| Waterloo, Iowa, United States
| 
|-
| Win
| align=center| 230–45–10 (1)
| Abraham Garcia
| TKO (doctor stoppage)
| CVFA: Rumble in Hills
| 
| align=center| 1
| align=center| 1:14
| Hills, Iowa, United States
| 
|-
| Win
| align=center| 229–45–10 (1)
| Jeff Flanagan
| TKO (punches)
| Thunder in the Sand
| 
| align=center| 2
| align=center| N/A
| Conesville, Iowa, United States
| 
|-
| Win
| align=center| 228–45–10 (1)
| Austin Sisson
| KO (punches)
| Iowa Challenge 53: Kickfest in the Cage
| 
| align=center| 2
| align=center| 0:12
| Iowa, United States
| 
|-
| Win
| align=center| 227–45–10 (1)
| Tony Crawford
| Submission (rear-naked choke)
| MFC 8: Ultimate Outlaws
| 
| align=center| 1
| align=center| 1:12
| Iowa, United States
| 
|-
| Win
| align=center| 226–45–10 (1)
| Dylan Sherman
| KO (head kick)
| CVFA: Season's Beatings
| 
| align=center| 2
| align=center| 0:10
| Waterloo, Iowa, United States
| 
|-
| Win
| align=center| 225–45–10 (1)
| Jamie Klair
| KO (punches)
| TCI: Season's Beatings
| 
| align=center| 1
| align=center| 0:21
| Sioux Falls, South Dakota, United States
| 
|-
| Win
| align=center| 224–45–10 (1)
| Preston Shane
| Submission (rear-naked choke)
| CVFA: Rumble on the Rock 2
| 
| align=center| 3
| align=center| N/A
| Steamboat Rock, Iowa, United States
| 
|-
| Win
| align=center| 223–45–10 (1)
| Dylan Sherman
| Submission (rear-naked choke)
| IC 49: Kickfest
| 
| align=center| 1
| align=center| 2:42
| Waterloo, Iowa, United States
| 
|-
| Win
| align=center| 222–45–10 (1)
| Bryan Robinson
| Submission (kimura)
| TCI: Fight Hunger
| 
| align=center| 1
| align=center| 2:24
| Sioux Falls, South Dakota, United States
| 
|-
| Win
| align=center| 221–45–10 (1)
| Bryan Robinson
| TKO (punches)
| CVFA: Rumble on the Rock
| 
| align=center| 2
| align=center| 1:00
| Steamboat Rock, Iowa, United States
| 
|-
| Win
| align=center| 220–45–10 (1)
| Christopher Clarkson
| TKO (punches)
| CVFA: Battle For Women's Belts
| 
| align=center| 1
| align=center| 0:46
| Waterloo, Iowa, United States
| 
|-
| Win
| align=center| 219–45–10 (1)
| Vic Hall
| Submission (rear-naked choke)
| CVFA: Independence Day
| 
| align=center| 2
| align=center| 0:27
| Cedar Falls, Iowa, United States
| 
|-
| Win
| align=center| 218–45–10 (1)
| Steve Shewry
| KO (punch)
| CVFA: Battle For the Belts
| 
| align=center| 2
| align=center| 0:07
| Waterloo, Iowa, United States
| 
|-
| Win
| align=center| 217–45–10 (1)
| Steve Shewry
| KO (punches)
| CVFA: Ironman Challenge
| 
| align=center| 3
| align=center| N/A
| Pella, Iowa, United States
| 
|-
| Win
| align=center| 216–45–10 (1)
| Kris Crabtree
| Submission (rear-naked choke)
| Extreme Challenge 90
| 
| align=center| 1
| align=center| N/A
| Fort Dodge, Iowa, United States
| 
|-
| Win
| align=center| 215–45–10 (1)
| Matt Langbehn
| KO (punch)
| Cedar Valley Fighting Association
| 
| align=center| 1
| align=center| N/A
| Waterloo, Iowa, United States
| 
|-
| Loss
| align=center| 214–45–10 (1)
| Chris Tuchscherer
| Decision (unanimous)
| Max Fights 2
| 
| align=center| 3
| align=center| 5:00
| Fargo, North Dakota, United States
| 
|-
| Win
| align=center| 214–44–10 (1)
| Russ Love
| KO (punch)
| Iowa Challenge 46
| 
| align=center| 1
| align=center| 0:20
| Iowa, United States
| 
|-
| Loss
| align=center| 213–44–10 (1)
| Travis Wiuff
| TKO (punches)
| Smash: MMA
| 
| align=center| 2
| align=center| 3:27
| Virginia, United States
| 
|-
| Win
| align=center| 213–43–10 (1)
| Bryan Robinson
| TKO (punches)
| CVFA: Ironman Challenge
| 
| align=center| 2
| align=center| 1:10
| Rudd, Iowa, United States
| 
|-
| Win
| align=center| 212–43–10 (1)
| Bryan Ewhers
| Submission (rear-naked choke)
| CVFA: Fall Brawl
| 
| align=center| 3
| align=center| 1:15
| Waterloo, Iowa, United States
| 
|-
| Win
| align=center| 211–43–10 (1)
| Wes Sims
| Decision (unanimous)
| FF: Capitol Punishment
| 
| align=center| 3
| align=center| 5:00
| Columbus, Ohio, United States
| 
|-
| Win
| align=center| 210–43–10 (1)
| Bryan Robinson
| TKO (Submission to punches)
| CVFA: Brawl at the Falls 2
| 
| align=center| 3
| align=center| N/A
| Iowa Falls, Iowa, United States
| 
|-
| Win
| align=center| 209–43–10 (1)
| Paul Bowers
| Decision (split)
| Max Fights 1
| 
| align=center| 3
| align=center| 5:00
| Fargo, North Dakota, United States
| 
|-
| Win
| align=center| 208–43–10 (1)
| Wayne Porter
| Submission (americana)
| Iowa Challenge 39
| 
| align=center| 1
| align=center| 0:53
| Iowa, United States
| 
|-
| Win
| align=center| 207–43–10 (1)
| Mark Long
| KO (punches)
| CVFA: Summer Beatdown
| 
| align=center| 2
| align=center| 1:37
| Waterloo, Iowa, United States
| 
|-
| Win
| align=center| 206–43–10 (1)
| Dusty Puckett
| TKO (Submission to punches)
| Extreme Challenge 79
| 
| align=center| 1
| align=center| 2:02
| Davenport, Iowa, United States
| 
|-
| Loss
| align=center| 205–43–10 (1)
| Ben Rothwell
| Submission (kimura)
| IFL: Chicago
| 
| align=center| 2
| align=center| 3:11
| Chicago, Illinois, United States
| 
|-
| Win
| align=center| 205–42–10 (1)
| Mark Boyer
| KO (punch)
| Battle of Champions: Round 2
| 
| align=center| 1
| align=center| 1:31
| Davenport, Iowa, United States
| 
|-
| Win
| align=center| 204–42–10 (1)
| Tyson Smith
| TKO (punches)
| CVFA: Return of the Champions
| 
| align=center| 1
| align=center| 1:24
| Iowa, United States
| 
|-
| Win
| align=center| 203–42–10 (1)
| Steve Fiscus
| KO (punch)
| Revolution Cage Fighting 6
| 
| align=center| 1
| align=center| 1:03
| Eau Claire, Wisconsin, United States
| 
|-
| Win
| align=center| 202–42–10 (1)
| AJ Broer
| KO (punch)
| Ironman Challenge 27
| 
| align=center| 1
| align=center| 0:25
| Iowa, United States
| 
|-
| Win
| align=center| 201–42–10 (1)
| Jessie Garcia
| TKO (punches)
| Ironman Challenge 22
| 
| align=center| 1
| align=center| 2:33
| Iowa, United States
| 
|-
| Win
| align=center| 200–42–10 (1)
| Kirk Nielsen
| Submission (guillotine choke)
| Ironman Challenge 22
| 
| align=center| 1
| align=center| 1:10
| Iowa, United States
| 
|-
| Win
| align=center| 199–42–10 (1)
| Rory Prazak
| Submission (americana)
| Ironman Challenge 21
| 
| align=center| 4
| align=center| 0:40
| Iowa, United States
| 
|-
| Win
| align=center| 198–42–10 (1)
| Rodney Arp
| Submission (rear-naked choke)
| Ironman Challenge 21
| 
| align=center| 4
| align=center| 0:42
| Iowa, United States
| 
|-
| Win
| align=center| 197–42–10 (1)
| Jason Roszell
| TKO (punches)
| Iowa Challenge 34
| 
| align=center| 1
| align=center| 1:24
| Quincy, Illinois, United States
| 
|-
| Win
| align=center| 196–42–10 (1)
| Scott Pulse
| KO (punch)
| Fury Fights: Temple Fight Night
| 
| align=center| 1
| align=center| 0:12
| Brookings, South Dakota, United States
| 
|-
| Win
| align=center| 195–42–10 (1)
| Mike Kofoot
| TKO (slam)
| Ironman Challenge 17
| 
| align=center| 3
| align=center| N/A
| Iowa, United States
| 
|-
| Win
| align=center| 194–42–10 (1)
| Bryan Robinson
| Submission (armbar)
| Ironman Challenge 14
| 
| align=center| 5
| align=center| N/A
| Iowa, United States
| 
|-
| Win
| align=center| 193–42–10 (1)
| Steve Fiscus
| KO (punches)
| Ironman Challenge 14
| 
| align=center| 3
| align=center| N/A
| Iowa, United States
| 
|-
| Win
| align=center| 192–42–10 (1)
| Bryan Robinson
| KO (punch)
| Ironman Challenge 13
| 
| align=center| 2
| align=center| 1:44
| Iowa, United States
| 
|-
| Win
| align=center| 191–42–10 (1)
| John Medina
| TKO (Submission to punches)
| Ironman Challenge 12
| 
| align=center| 1
| align=center| 1:57
| Iowa, United States
| 
|-
| Win
| align=center| 190–42–10 (1)
| Manuel Quiroz
| Submission (toe hold)
| Ironman Challenge 11
| 
| align=center| 1
| align=center| 3:20
| Manchester, Iowa, United States
| 
|-
| Win
| align=center| 189–42–10 (1)
| Belal Alhmaibie
| Submission (armbar)
| Kickfest 11: Fall Brawl
| 
| align=center| 2
| align=center| 1:34
| Waterloo, Iowa, United States
| 
|-
| Win
| align=center| 188–42–10 (1)
| Mike Kofoot
| TKO (slam)
| NFA: Night of the Beast
| 
| align=center| 1
| align=center| N/A
| Fargo, North Dakota, United States
| 
|-
| Win
| align=center| 187–42–10 (1)
| Mike Kofoot
| TKO (doctor stoppage)
| Fight Club Underground
| 
| align=center| 1
| align=center| N/A
| Minneapolis, Minnesota, United States
| 
|-
| Win
| align=center| 186–42–10 (1)
| Ben Thomas 
| TKO (Submission to punches)
| Iowa Challenge 30
| 
| align=center| 1
| align=center| 3:55
| Waterloo, Iowa, United States
| 
|-
| Win
| align=center| 185–42–10 (1)
| Mike Kofoot
| KO (punches)
| Royalty Fight Night 1
| 
| align=center| 1
| align=center| 0:51
| Emmetsburg, Iowa, United States
| 
|-
| Win
| align=center| 184–42–10 (1)
| Shawn Nolan
| TKO (punches)
| Rumble on the River 6
| 
| align=center| 1
| align=center| 0:45
| Conesville, Iowa, United States
| 
|-
| Win
| align=center| 183–42–10 (1)
| Brad Scholten
| KO (punches)
| Extreme Contact Fighting 2
| 
| align=center| 1
| align=center| 1:49
| Fort Dodge, Iowa, United States
| 
|-
| Win
| align=center| 182–42–10 (1)
| John George
| KO (punches)
| Kickfest 10: Summer Brawl
| 
| align=center| 1
| align=center| 1:36
| Iowa, United States
| 
|-
| Win
| align=center| 181–42–10 (1)
| Ben Byrd
| TKO (punches)
| Ironman Challenge 8
| 
| align=center| 1
| align=center| 1:05
| Prairie du Chien, Wisconsin, United States
| 
|-
| Win
| align=center| 180–42–10 (1)
| John McElroy
| KO (punches)
| River City Fight Club
| 
| align=center| 1
| align=center| 3:29
| Conesville, Iowa, United States
| 
|-
| Win
| align=center| 179–42–10 (1)
| Rory Prazak
| KO (punches)
| Ironman Challenge 7
| 
| align=center| 1
| align=center| N/A
| Iowa, United States
| 
|-
| Win
| align=center| 178–42–10 (1)
| Dan Wheatley
| KO (punches)
| Ironman Challenge 6
| 
| align=center| 2
| align=center| N/A
| Iowa, United States
| 
|-
| Win
| align=center| 177–42–10 (1)
| Mark Long
| KO (punches)
| CVFA: Caged Combat
| 
| align=center| 1
| align=center| 1:59
| Iowa, United States
| 
|-
| Win
| align=center| 176–42–10 (1)
| Mike Caswell
| KO (punch)
| CVFA: Friday Night Throwdown 2
| 
| align=center| 1
| align=center| 0:10
| Waterloo, Iowa, United States
| 
|-
| Win
| align=center| 175–42–10 (1)
| Chris Clark
| Submission (front choke)
| Ironman Challenge 2
| 
| align=center| 2
| align=center| N/A
| Iowa, United States
| 
|-
| Win
| align=center| 174–42–10 (1)
| Nowanda Bell
| KO (punch)
| Ironman Challenge 1
| 
| align=center| 2
| align=center| 0:20
| Charles City, Iowa, United States
| 
|-
| Win
| align=center| 173–42–10 (1)
| Shawn Nolan
| TKO (punches)
| CVFA: Friday Night Throwdown
| 
| align=center| 1
| align=center| 1:17
| Cedar Rapids, Iowa, United States
| 
|-
| Win
| align=center| 172–42–10 (1)
| Manuel Quiroz
| KO (punches)
| Coliseum 2
| 
| align=center| 1
| align=center| N/A
| Rochester, Minnesota, United States
| 
|-
| Win
| align=center| 171–42–10 (1)
| Brandon Quigley
| Submission (rear-naked choke)
| Kickfest: November Kickfest
| 
| align=center| 1
| align=center| N/A
| Moline, Illinois, United States
| 
|-
| Win
| align=center| 170–42–10 (1)
| Chris Clark
| TKO (Submission to punches)
| Rumble on the River 5
| 
| align=center| 1
| align=center| 0:50
| Conesville, Iowa, United States
| 
|-
| Win
| align=center| 169–42–10 (1)
| Steve Pilkington
| Submission (rear-naked choke)
| AFA: The Octagon 2
| 
| align=center| 1
| align=center| 2:20
| Waterloo, Iowa, United States
| 
|-
| Win
| align=center| 168–42–10 (1)
| Dan Wheatley
| KO (punch)
| Spring Brawl
| 
| align=center| 1
| align=center| N/A
| Minot, North Dakota, United States
| 
|-
| Win
| align=center| 167–42–10 (1)
| Rory Prazak
| KO (punch)
| Spring Brawl
| 
| align=center| 1
| align=center| N/A
| Minot, North Dakota, United States
| 
|-
| Win
| align=center| 166–42–10 (1)
| Session Harper
| Submission (rear-naked choke)
| XKK: St. Paul
| 
| align=center| 1
| align=center| 0:35
| St. Paul, Minnesota, United States
| 
|-
| Loss
| align=center| 165–42–10 (1)
| Mike Whitehead
| Submission (scarfhold headlock choke)
| Extreme Challenge 61
| 
| align=center| 1
| align=center| 1:48
| Osceola, Iowa, United States
| 
|-
| Win
| align=center| 165–41–10 (1)
| Dan Wheatley
| TKO (Submission to punches)
| AFC 1: Takedown
| 
| align=center| 1
| align=center| N/A
| Omaha, Nebraska, United States
| 
|-
| Win
| align=center| 164–41–10 (1)
| Greg Larson
| Submission (armbar)
| Downtown Destruction 3
| 
| align=center| 1
| align=center| N/A
| Des Moines, Iowa, United States
| 
|-
| Win
| align=center| 163–41–10 (1)
| Kaelan Gruchow
| Submission (rear-naked choke)
| Kickfest 8
| 
| align=center| 1
| align=center| 1:18
| Clive, Iowa, United States
| 
|-
| Win
| align=center| 162–41–10 (1)
| Rory Prazak
| TKO (punches)
| NFA: Super Brawl
| 
| align=center| 1
| align=center| 2:13
| North Dakota, United States
| 
|-
| Win
| align=center| 161–41–10 (1)
| Kyle Olsen
| TKO (Submission to punches)
| AFA: Friday Night Fights
| 
| align=center| 1
| align=center| 1:00
| Waterloo, Iowa, United States
| 
|-
| Win
| align=center| 160–41–10 (1)
| Manuel Quiroz
| Submission (rear-naked choke)
| Downtown Destruction 1
| 
| align=center| 1
| align=center| 0:49
| Des Moines, Iowa, United States
| 
|-
| Win
| align=center| 159–41–10 (1)
| Don Richards
| TKO (corner stoppage)
| KOTC 45: King of the Cage 45
| 
| align=center| 1
| align=center| 5:00
| Belterra, Indiana, United States
| 
|-
| Win
| align=center| 158–41–10 (1)
| Kaelan Gruchow
| KO (punches)
| Iowa Challenge 17
| 
| align=center| 1
| align=center| N/A
| Marshalltown, Iowa, United States
| 
|-
| Win
| align=center| 157–41–10 (1)
| Mark Long
| TKO (Submission to punches)
| XKK: Fridley
| 
| align=center| 2
| align=center| 0:16
| Fridley, Minnesota, United States
| 
|-
| Win
| align=center| 156–41–10 (1)
| Dan Wheatley
| TKO (Submission to punches)
| Judgment Night 2
| 
| align=center| 1
| align=center| 1:48
| Des Moines, Iowa, United States
| 
|-
| Win
| align=center| 155–41–10 (1)
| Matt Albright
| TKO (punches)
| XKK: Des Moines
| 
| align=center| 1
| align=center| 0:22
| Des Moines, Iowa, United States
| 
|-
| Win
| align=center| 154–41–10 (1)
| Dan Wheatley
| KO (head kick)
| Iowa Challenge 16
| 
| align=center| 1
| align=center| N/A
| Oskaloosa, Iowa, United States
| 
|-
| Win
| align=center| 153–41–10 (1)
| Dan Wheatley
| KO (head kick)
| Judgment Night 1
| 
| align=center| 1
| align=center| N/A
| Des Moines, Iowa, United States
| 
|-
| Win
| align=center| 152–41–10 (1)
| Brandon Quigley
| Submission (rear-naked choke)
| NFA: Battle For the Belts
| 
| align=center| 1
| align=center| N/A
| East Grand Forks, Minnesota, United States
| 
|-
| Win
| align=center| 151–41–10 (1)
| Jeremy Shuey
| TKO (Submission to punches)
| River City Fight Club
| 
| align=center| 1
| align=center| N/A
| Iowa, United States
| 
|-
| Win
| align=center| 150–41–10 (1)
| Albert Newberry
| Submission (guillotine choke)
| Xtreme Kage Kombat
| 
| align=center| 1
| align=center| N/A
| Des Moines, Iowa, United States
| 
|-
| Win
| align=center| 149–41–10 (1)
| Tom McCloud
| Submission (guillotine choke)
| Ultimate Throwdown
| 
| align=center| 1
| align=center| 2:13
| Des Moines, Iowa, United States
| 
|-
| Win
| align=center| 148–41–10 (1)
| Rory Prazak
| Submission (arm-triangle choke)
| Iowa Extreme Fighting
| 
| align=center| 2
| align=center| 2:23
| Fort Dodge, Iowa, United States
| 
|-
| Win
| align=center| 147–41–10 (1)
| Ivan Carabello
| TKO (Submission to punches)
| Dangerzone 26: Professional Level Cage Fighting
| 
| align=center| 1
| align=center| 0:32
| Osceola, Iowa, United States
| 
|-
| Win
| align=center| 146–41–10 (1)
| Joe Ripple
| Submission (front choke)
| Bar Room Brawl 25
| 
| align=center| 1
| align=center| 1:19
| Owatonna, Minnesota, United States
| 
|-
| Win
| align=center| 145–41–10 (1)
| Rory Prazak
| Submission (armbar)
| Bar Room Brawl 25
| 
| align=center| 1
| align=center| 2:50
| Owatonna, Minnesota, United States
| 
|-
| Win
| align=center| 144–41–10 (1)
| Albert Newberry
| Submission (guillotine choke)
| AFA: Return of the Champions
| 
| align=center| 1
| align=center| N/A
| Waterloo, Iowa, United States
| 
|-
| Win
| align=center| 143–41–10 (1)
| Adam Norciaj
| KO (punch)
| NFA: Best Damn Fights
| 
| align=center| 1
| align=center| 0:05
| Fargo, North Dakota, United States
| 
|-
| Win
| align=center| 142–41–10 (1)
| Mike Preece
| TKO (Submission to punches)
| VFC 7: Showdown
| 
| align=center| 1
| align=center| 0:20
| Council Bluffs, Iowa, United States
| 
|-
| Loss
| align=center| 141–41–10 (1)
| Eric Pele
| Submission (verbal)
| KOTC 32: Bringing Heat
| 
| align=center| 1
| align=center| 1:35
| Miami, Florida, United States
| 
|-
| Win
| align=center| 141–40–10 (1)
| Manuel Quiroz
| TKO (Submission to punches)
| AFA: Battle For the Belts 2
| 
| align=center| 1
| align=center| 1:03
| Iowa, United States
| 
|-
| Win
| align=center| 140–40–10 (1)
| Rory Prazak
| Submission (guillotine choke)
| Bar Room Brawl 21
| 
| align=center| 1
| align=center| 0:45
| Owatonna, Minnesota, United States
| 
|-
| Win
| align=center| 139–40–10 (1)
| Doug Sauer
| Submission (rear-naked choke)
| RSF: Shooto Challenge 2
| 
| align=center| 1
| align=center| 2:05
| Belleville, Illinois, United States
| 
|-
| Win
| align=center| 138–40–10 (1)
| Jason Purcell
| Submission (armbar)
| AFA: Second Coming
| 
| align=center| 1
| align=center| 2:40
| Mason City, Iowa, United States
| 
|-
| Win
| align=center| 137–40–10 (1)
| Travis Utley
| Submission (rear-naked choke)
| Bar Room Brawl 18
| 
| align=center| 1
| align=center| 0:46
| Owatonna, Minnesota, United States
| 
|-
| Loss
| align=center| 136–40–10 (1)
| Travis Wiuff
| Decision (split)
| Iowa Challenge 11
| 
| align=center| 3
| align=center| 3:00
| Iowa, United States
| 
|-
| Win
| align=center| 136–39–10 (1)
| Joe Alvarez
| KO (punches)
| Iowa Extreme Fighting 11
| 
| align=center| 1
| align=center| 2:45
| Iowa, United States
| 
|-
| Win
| align=center| 135–39–10 (1)
| Brian Dunn
| Submission (rear-naked choke)
| RSF: Shooto Challenge
| 
| align=center| 1
| align=center| 1:35
| Belleville, Illinois, United States
| 
|-
| Win
| align=center| 134–39–10 (1)
| Joe Nameth
| Submission (kimura)
| CFM: Octogono Extremo
| 
| align=center| 1
| align=center| N/A
| Monterrey, Mexico
| 
|-
| Loss
| align=center| 133–39–10 (1)
| Ray Seraile
| Decision (unanimous)
| SuperBrawl 31
| 
| align=center| 3
| align=center| 3:00
| Honolulu, Hawaii, United States
| 
|-
| Win
| align=center| 133–38–10 (1)
| Rory Prazak
| TKO (punches)
| Bar Room Brawl 14
| 
| align=center| 2
| align=center| 2:37
| United States
| 
|-
| Win
| align=center| 132–38–10 (1)
| Vince Lucero
| Submission (guillotine choke)
| XCF 2: Havoc in Havasu 1
| 
| align=center| 1
| align=center| 2:30
| Lake Havasu City, Arizona, United States
| 
|-
| Win
| align=center| 131–38–10 (1)
| Bryan Robinson
| KO (spinning back kick)
| Kickfest 6
| 
| align=center| 1
| align=center| 0:30
| Waterloo, Iowa, United States
| 
|-
| Win
| align=center| 130–38–10 (1)
| Michael Miller
| Submission (rear-naked choke)
| Extreme Challenge 52
| 
| align=center| 1
| align=center| 0:45
| Rock Island, Illinois, United States
| 
|-
| Loss
| align=center| 129–38–10 (1)
| Miodrag Petkovic
| Decision (unanimous)
| DF: Durata World Grand Prix 2
| 
| align=center| 1
| align=center| 5:00
| Opatija, Croatia
| 
|-
| Win
| align=center| 129–37–10 (1)
| Brian Dunn
| KO (punch)
| AFA: Battle For the Belts
| 
| align=center| 2
| align=center| 0:10
| Iowa, United States
| 
|-
| Win
| align=center| 128–37–10 (1)
| Lewis Burns
| Submission (guillotine choke)
| AFA: Battle For the Belts
| 
| align=center| 1
| align=center| 0:25
| Iowa, United States
| 
|-
| Win
| align=center| 127–37–10 (1)
| Victor Rohrer
| Submission (front choke)
| Independence Day Showdown
| 
| align=center| 1
| align=center| N/A
| 
| 
|-
| Win
| align=center| 126–37–10 (1)
| Mike Delaney
| Decision (unanimous)
| Freestyle Combat Challenge 11
| 
| align=center| 3
| align=center| 5:00
| Racine, Wisconsin, United States
| 
|-
| Win
| align=center| 125–37–10 (1)
| Demian Decorah
| Decision (unanimous)
| IFA: The Return
| 
| align=center| 1
| align=center| 9:00
| Iowa, United States
| 
|-
| Win
| align=center| 124–37–10 (1)
| Jeremy Armstrong
| KO (punch)
| IFA: The Return
| 
| align=center| 1
| align=center| 1:01
| Iowa, United States
| 
|-
| Draw
| align=center| 123–37–10 (1)
| Bruce Nelson
| Draw
| Sabin Showdown
| 
| align=center| 3
| align=center| 3:00
| Moorhead, Minnesota, United States
| 
|-
| Loss
| align=center| 123–37–9 (1)
| Greg Wikan
| Submission (verbal)
| ICC 2: Rebellion
| 
| align=center| 1
| align=center| 4:43
| Minneapolis, Minnesota, United States
| 
|-
| Win
| align=center| 123–36–9 (1)
| Royce Louck
| TKO (Submission to punches)
| Minnesota Extreme Fight 2
| 
| align=center| 1
| align=center| N/A
| Duluth, Minnesota, United States
| 
|-
| Win
| align=center| 122–36–9 (1)
| Joe Riggs
| Submission (choke)
| RITC 45: Finally
| 
| align=center| 1
| align=center| 0:48
| Phoenix, Arizona, United States
| 
|-
| Win
| align=center| 121–36–9 (1)
| Dan Croonquist
| Submission (guillotine choke)
| CAGE
| 
| align=center| 1
| align=center| 4:28
| Fort Dodge, Iowa, United States
| 
|-
| Win
| align=center| 120–36–9 (1)
| Jeremy Armstrong
| TKO (Submission to punches)
| CAGE
| 
| align=center| 1
| align=center| 0:57
| Fort Dodge, Iowa, United States
| 
|-
| Win
| align=center| 119–36–9 (1)
| Mitch Walters
| KO (punch)
| CAGE
| 
| align=center| 1
| align=center| 0:12
| Fort Dodge, Iowa, United States
| 
|-
| Win
| align=center| 118–36–9 (1)
| Jeremy Armstrong
| Submission (rear-naked choke)
| Sokol Hall Brawl 3
| 
| align=center| 1
| align=center| 0:47
| Omaha, Nebraska, United States
| 
|-
| Loss
| align=center| 117–36–9 (1)
| Jeremy Horn
| TKO (corner stoppage)
| ICC 1: Retribution
| 
| align=center| 2
| align=center| 0:50
| Minneapolis, Minnesota, United States
| 
|-
| Win
| align=center| 117–35–9 (1)
| Mike Toyne
| TKO (Submission to punches)
| Blairstown Brawl 7
| 
| align=center| 1
| align=center| 1:40
| Blairstown, Iowa, United States
| 
|-
| Win
| align=center| 116–35–9 (1)
| Josh Stamp
| TKO (Submission to punches)
| Extreme Combat 1
| 
| align=center| 1
| align=center| 1:45
| Minneapolis, Minnesota, United States
| 
|-
| Win
| align=center| 115–35–9 (1)
| Raymond Luna
| Submission (guillotine choke)
| Thursday Night Fights
| 
| align=center| 1
| align=center| 1:17
| Mason City, Iowa, United States
| 
|-
| Loss
| align=center| 114–35–9 (1)
| Forrest Griffin
| TKO (doctor stoppage)
| CC 1: Halloween Heat
| 
| align=center| 1
| align=center| 5:00
| Atlanta, Georgia, United States
| 
|-
| Win
| align=center| 114–34–9 (1)
| Adam Harris
| KO (punch)
| Blairstown Brawl 6
| 
| align=center| 1
| align=center| 0:06
| Blairstown, Iowa, United States
| 
|-
| Loss
| align=center| 113–34–9 (1)
| Ben Rothwell
| TKO (Submission to injury)
| Freestyle Combat Challenge 8
| 
| align=center| 1
| align=center| 5:00
| Racine, Wisconsin, United States
| 
|-
| Win
| align=center| 113–33–9 (1)
| Riley McIlhon
| Submission (rear-naked choke)
| Iowa Challenge 6
| 
| align=center| 1
| align=center| 4:13
| Iowa, United States
| 
|-
| Loss
| align=center| 112–33–9 (1)
| Travis Wiuff
| Decision (unanimous)
| Iowa Challenge 5
| 
| align=center| 3
| align=center| 5:00
| Iowa, United States
| 
|-
| Win
| align=center| 112–32–9 (1)
| Johnathan Ivey
| Submission (kimura)
| XCF: California Pancration Championships
| 
| align=center| 1
| align=center| 3:39
| Los Angeles, California, United States
| 
|-
| Win
| align=center| 111–32–9 (1)
| Darren Peyton
| TKO (Submission to punches)
| Iowa Extreme Fighting 7
| 
| align=center| 1
| align=center| 3:30
| Iowa, United States
| 
|-
| Win
| align=center| 110–32–9 (1)
| Kevin Oliver
| TKO (Submission to punches)
| American Reality Combat 3
| 
| align=center| 1
| align=center| 0:28
| Evansdale, Iowa, United States
| 
|-
| Win
| align=center| 109–32–9 (1)
| Carle Garner
| Submission (rear-naked choke)
| Tuesday Night Fights
| 
| align=center| 1
| align=center| 0:49
| 
| 
|-
| Win
| align=center| 108–32–9 (1)
| Don Lawrence
| TKO (Submission to punches)
| Sunday Night Fights
| 
| align=center| 1
| align=center| 0:13
| 
| 
|-
| Win
| align=center| 107–32–9 (1)
| Jason Bentley
| TKO (Submission to punches)
| Iowa Challenge 4
| 
| align=center| 1
| align=center| 0:40
| Iowa, United States
| 
|-
| Win
| align=center| 106–32–9 (1)
| Robbie Beltz
| TKO (Submission to punches)
| Tuesday Night Fights
| 
| align=center| 1
| align=center| 0:14
| Cedar Rapids, Iowa, United States
| 
|-
| Win
| align=center| 105–32–9 (1)
| Bruce Nelson
| TKO (Submission to punches)
| Friday Night Fights
| 
| align=center| 1
| align=center| 2:38
| 
| 
|-
| Win
| align=center| 104–32–9 (1)
| Tony Day
| KO (punch)
| Tuesday Night Fights
| 
| align=center| 1
| align=center| 0:34
| Cedar Rapids, Iowa, United States
| 
|-
| Win
| align=center| 103–32–9 (1)
| Tony Day
| KO (punches)
| Freestyle Combat Challenge 6
| 
| align=center| 1
| align=center| 1:24
| Racine, Wisconsin, United States
| 
|-
| Loss
| align=center| 102–32–9 (1)
| Mike Radnov
| Decision (unanimous)
| Rock 'N' Rumble 1
| 
| align=center| 3
| align=center| 5:00
| 
| 
|-
| Win
| align=center| 102–31–9 (1)
| Don Hildebrandt
| TKO (punches)
| CFC: Winter War
| 
| align=center| 1
| align=center| 1:03
| Iowa, United States
| 
|-
| Win
| align=center| 101–31–9 (1)
| Brad Russell
| KO (punch)
| Iowa Fight Night 3
| 
| align=center| 1
| align=center| 0:19
| Iowa, United States
| 
|-
| Win
| align=center| 100–31–9 (1)
| Anthony Seu
| Submission (rear-naked choke)
| Iowa Fight Night 2
| 
| align=center| 1
| align=center| 1:11
| Iowa, United States
| 
|-
| Win
| align=center| 99–31–9 (1)
| Scott Walker
| KO (punch)
| Iowa Fight Night 1
| 
| align=center| 2
| align=center| 1:09
| Iowa, United States
| 
|-
| NC
| align=center| 98–31–9 (1)
| Greg Wikan
| NC (premature stoppage)
| UW: Street Fight Minnesota
| 
| align=center| 1
| align=center| N/A
| St. Paul, Minnesota, United States
| 
|-
| Draw
| align=center| 98–31–9
| Dan Severn
| Draw
| Iowa Challenge 3
| 
| align=center| 3
| align=center| 5:00
| Waterloo, Iowa, United States
| 
|-
| Win
| align=center| 98–31–8
| Jamie Webb
| TKO (punches)
| Gladiators 18
| 
| align=center| 1
| align=center| 0:28
| 
| 
|-
| Win
| align=center| 97–31–8
| Tony Day
| TKO (punches)
| Iowa Challenge 2
| 
| align=center| 1
| align=center| 0:38
| Cedar Rapids, Iowa, United States
| 
|-
| Win
| align=center| 96–31–8
| Matt Clemens
| TKO (punches)
| Ultimate Submission Challenge
| 
| align=center| 1
| align=center| 0:45
| Bethalto, Illinois, United States
| 
|-
| Loss
| align=center| 95–31–8
| Dan Severn
| Decision (unanimous)
| WEC 1: Princes of Pain
| 
| align=center| 3
| align=center| 5:00
| Lemoore, California, United States
| 
|-
| Win
| align=center| 95–30–8
| Andy Burwell
| TKO (Submission to punches)
| Rumble on the River 2
| 
| align=center| 1
| align=center| 0:38
| West Terre Haute, Indiana, United States
| 
|-
| Win
| align=center| 94–30–8
| Robert Bryant
| TKO (Submission to punches)
| Lincoln Fights 2
| 
| align=center| 1
| align=center| 0:45
| 
| 
|-
| Win
| align=center| 93–30–8
| Cal Worsham
| TKO (corner stoppage)
| IFC Warriors Challenge 13
| 
| align=center| 2
| align=center| 5:00
| California, United States
| 
|-
| Win
| align=center| 92–30–8
| Demetrius Worlds
| Submission (rear-naked choke)
| Lincoln Fights 1
| 
| align=center| 1
| align=center| 2:10
| 
| 
|-
| Win
| align=center| 91–30–8
| Ben Boyer
| TKO (Submission to punches)
| Thursday Night Fights
| 
| align=center| 1
| align=center| 0:25
| Omaha, Nebraska, United States
| 
|-
| Win
| align=center| 90–30–8
| Lionel Saunders
| Submission (armbar)
| Thursday Night Fights
| 
| align=center| 1
| align=center| 1:30
| Omaha, Nebraska, United States
| 
|-
| Win
| align=center| 89–30–8
| John Medina
| Submission (armbar)
| IFF 8: End Game
| 
| align=center| 1
| align=center| 0:39
| Iowa, United States
| 
|-
| Draw
| align=center| 88–30–8
| Clayton Miller
| Draw
| Iowa Challenge Eliminations 1
| 
| align=center| 1
| align=center| 10:00
| 
| 
|-
| Draw
| align=center| 88–30–7
| Mark Jaquith
| Draw
| Kickfest 3
| 
| align=center| 1
| align=center| 12:00
| Iowa, United States
| 
|-
| Win
| align=center| 88–30–6
| Ben Boyer
| Submission (rear-naked choke)
| Freestyle Combat Challenge 4
| 
| align=center| 1
| align=center| 0:48
| Racine, Wisconsin, United States
| 
|-
| Win
| align=center| 87–30–6
| Allan Sullivan
| Submission (armbar)
| Reality Submission Fighting 3
| 
| align=center| 1
| align=center| 7:35
| Belleville, Illinois, United States
| 
|-
| Loss
| align=center| 86–30–6
| Rich Franklin
| TKO (broken hand)
| Rings USA: Battle of Champions
| 
| align=center| 1
| align=center| 5:00
| Council Bluffs, Iowa, United States
| 
|-
| Win
| align=center| 86–29–6
| Ron Faircloth
| Submission (armbar)
| Iowa Challenge 1
| 
| align=center| 1
| align=center| 2:55
| Waterloo, Iowa, United States
| 
|-
| Win
| align=center| 85–29–6
| Kerry Schall
| TKO (punches)
| Extreme Tuesday Night Fights
| 
| align=center| 1
| align=center| 6:56
| Davenport, Iowa, United States
| 
|-
| Win
| align=center| 84–29–6
| Troy Rugger
| Submission (armbar)
| Freestyle Combat Challenge 3
| 
| align=center| 1
| align=center| 0:45
| 
| 
|-
| Loss
| align=center| 83–29–6
| Harout Terzyan
| Submission (toe hold)
| Reality Submission Fighting 2
| 
| align=center| 1
| align=center| 3:26
| 
| 
|-
| Win
| align=center| 83–28–6
| Troy Rugger
| TKO (Submission to punches)
| Iowa Free Fight 7
| 
| align=center| 1
| align=center| 1:20
| Iowa, United States
| 
|-
| Loss
| align=center| 82–28–6
| Evan Tanner
| Submission (triangle choke)
| Unified Shoot Wrestling Federation 18
| 
| align=center| 1
| align=center| 4:31
| Amarillo, Texas, United States
| 
|-
| Win
| align=center| 82–27–6
| Steve Miller
| TKO (Submission to punches)
| Iowa Free Fight 6
| 
| align=center| 1
| align=center| 1:47
| Iowa, United States
| 
|-
| Loss
| align=center| 81–27–6
| Mike Rogers
| Submission (neck crank)
| Submission Fighting Championships 12
| 
| align=center| 1
| align=center| N/A
| Collinsville, Illinois, United States
| 
|-
| Loss
| align=center| 81–26–6
| Dan Severn
| Submission (rear-naked choke)
| Dangerzone: Night of the Beast
| 
| align=center| 1
| align=center| 2:01
| Lynchburg, Virginia, United States
| 
|-
| Win
| align=center| 81–25–6
| Wesley Correira
| Submission (armbar)
| SuperBrawl 18
| 
| align=center| 1
| align=center| 4:49
| Agana, Guam
| 
|-
| Win
| align=center| 80–25–6
| Greg Wikan
| Submission (armbar)
| Rings USA: Rising Stars Final
| 
| align=center| 1
| align=center| 3:48
| Moline, Illinois, United States
| 
|-
| Win
| align=center| 79–25–6
| Bruce Nelson
| Submission (guillotine choke)
| IFF 5: Battle for the Belts
| 
| align=center| 1
| align=center| 1:19
| Iowa, United States
| 
|-
| Win
| align=center| 78–25–6
| Ron Rumpf
| KO (punch)
| IFF 5: Battle for the Belts
| 
| align=center| 1
| align=center| 0:08
| Iowa, United States
| 
|-
| Win
| align=center| 77–25–6
| Bruce Nelson
| KO (punches)
| IFF 5: Battle for the Belts
| 
| align=center| 1
| align=center| 2:54
| Iowa, United States
| 
|-
| Win
| align=center| 76–25–6
| Harry Moskowitz
| Submission (armbar)
| Submission Fighting Championships 11
| 
| align=center| 1
| align=center| 6:28
| Collinsville, Illinois, United States
| 
|-
| Win
| align=center| 75–25–6
| Quinton Lemke
| TKO (Submission to punches)
| Iowa Free Fight 4
| 
| align=center| 1
| align=center| 1:36
| Iowa, United States
| 
|-
| Loss
| align=center| 74–25–6
| Tsuyoshi Kosaka
| Decision (unanimous)
| Rings USA: Rising Stars Block A
| 
| align=center| 3
| align=center| 5:00
| Orem, Utah, United States
| 
|-
| Win
| align=center| 74–24–6
| Matt Frost
| Submission (rear-naked choke)
| Gladiators 7
| 
| align=center| 1
| align=center| 2:17
| 
| 
|-
| Loss
| align=center| 73–24–6
| Zaza Tkeshelashvili
| Submission (achilles lock)
| Rings Russia: Russia vs. The World
| 
| align=center| 1
| align=center| 1:20
| Yekaterinburg, Sverdlovsk, Russia
| 
|-
| Win
| align=center| 73–23–6
| Chad Gilson
| KO (punch)
| Submission Fighting Championships 10
| 
| align=center| 1
| align=center| 0:51
| Collinsville, Illinois, United States
| 
|-
| Loss
| align=center| 72–23–6
| Renato Sobral
| Submission (armbar)
| Rings: Millennium Combine 1
| 
| align=center| 1
| align=center| 4:49
| Tokyo, Japan
| 
|-
| Win
| align=center| 72–22–6
| Mitch Rosland
| TKO (Submission to punches)
| Iowa Free Fight 2
| 
| align=center| 1
| align=center| 1:11
| Iowa, United States
| 
|-
| Loss
| align=center| 71–22–6
| Ricco Rodriguez
| Submission (armbar)
| KOTC 2 - Desert Storm
| 
| align=center| 1
| align=center| 4:49
| San Jacinto, California, United States
| 
|-
| Win
| align=center| 71–21–6
| Jay Carmack
| Submission (guillotine choke)
| Submission Fighting Championships 9
| 
| align=center| 1
| align=center| 3:28
| Belleville, Illinois, United States
| 
|-
| Win
| align=center| 70–21–6
| Kristof Midoux
| KO (punches)
| IFC: Battleground 2000
| 
| align=center| 1
| align=center| 8:51
| Kahnawake, Quebec, Canada
| 
|-
| Win
| align=center| 69–21–6
| Shane Bailey
| TKO (punches)
| Iowa Free Fight 1
| 
| align=center| 1
| align=center| 0:24
| Iowa, United States
| 
|-
| Win
| align=center| 68–21–6
| Brad Schafer
| Submission (armbar)
| Iowa Free Fight 1
| 
| align=center| 1
| align=center| 7:38
| Iowa, United States
| 
|-
| Win
| align=center| 67–21–6
| Jason Fulcher
| TKO (punches)
| Iowa Free Fight 1
| 
| align=center| 1
| align=center| 1:03
| Iowa, United States
| 
|-
| Loss
| align=center| 66–21–6
| Branden Lee Hinkle
| TKO (injury)
| Holiday Fight Party
| 
| align=center| 1
| align=center| 12:38
| Georgia, United States
| 
|-
| Loss
| align=center| 66–20–6
| Ian Freeman
| TKO (retirement)
| MB 1: The Beginning
| 
| align=center| 2
| align=center| 5:00
| London, England
| 
|-
| Win
| align=center| 66–19–6
| Jason Allar
| TKO (Submission to elbows)
| Extreme Challenge 30
| 
| align=center| 1
| align=center| 2:53
| Council Bluffs, Iowa, United States
| 
|-
| Win
| align=center| 65–19–6
| Kevin Leemon
| TKO (Submission to punches)
| Iowa Extreme Fighting 5
| 
| align=center| 1
| align=center| 1:33
| Iowa, United States
| 
|-
| Win
| align=center| 64–19–6
| Mike Bruce
| TKO (Submission to punches)
| Dangerzone: Ft. Wayne
| 
| align=center| 1
| align=center| 0:55
| Fort Wayne, Indiana, United States
| 
|-
| Draw
| align=center| 63–19–6
| Sanae Kikuta
| Draw
| Pancrase - Breakthrough 9
| 
| align=center| 1
| align=center| 15:00
| Tokyo, Japan
| 
|-
| Win
| align=center| 63–19–5
| Brad Schafer
| Submission (armbar)
| Kickfest 2
| 
| align=center| 1
| align=center| 1:03
| Waterloo, Iowa, United States
| 
|-
| Win
| align=center| 62–19–5
| Aaron Keeney
| TKO (punches)
| Extreme Challenge: Trials
| 
| align=center| 1
| align=center| 1:54
| Mason City, Iowa, United States
| 
|-
| Loss
| align=center| 61–19–5
| John Marsh
| Submission (heel hook)
| SuperBrawl 13
| 
| align=center| 2
| align=center| 2:48
| Honolulu, Hawaii, United States
| 
|-
| Loss
| align=center| 61–18–5
| Tedd Williams
| Decision (unanimous)
| Lionheart Invitational
| 
| align=center| 1
| align=center| 20:00
| Atlanta, Georgia, United States
| 
|-
| Win
| align=center| 61–17–5
| Wade Rome
| TKO (punches)
| Extreme Challenge 27
| 
| align=center| 1
| align=center| 0:59
| Davenport, Iowa, United States
| 
|-
| Win
| align=center| 60–17–5
| Dan Chase
| KO (punch)
| Absolute Face Off
| 
| align=center| 1
| align=center| 0:40
| Phoenix, Arizona, United States
| align=left|
|-
| Win
| align=center| 59–17–5
| David Dodd
| Decision (unanimous)
| UFC 21: Return of the Champions
| 
| align=center| 2
| align=center| 5:00
| Cedar Rapids, Iowa, United States
| 
|-
| Loss
| align=center| 58–17–5
| Ahmad Ahmad
| Submission (heel hook)
| Neutral Grounds 12
| 
| align=center| 1
| align=center| N/A
| 
| 
|-
| Loss
| align=center| 58–16–5
| Jeremiah Miller
| Decision (unanimous)
| Neutral Grounds 12
| 
| align=center| 1
| align=center| 10:00
| 
| 
|-
| Win
| align=center| 58–15–5
| Heath Herring
| Decision (unanimous)
| Extreme Challenge 24
| 
| align=center| 1
| align=center| 12:00
| Salt Lake City, Utah, United States
| 
|-
| Loss
| align=center| 57–15–5
| Pete Williams
| Submission (armbar)
| UFC 20: Battle for the Gold
| 
| align=center| 1
| align=center| 6:28
| Birmingham, Alabama, United States
| 
|-
| Win
| align=center| 57–14–5
| Albert Newberry
| TKO (Submission to punches)
| Kickfest 1
| 
| align=center| 1
| align=center| 1:21
| Cedar Falls, Iowa, United States
| 
|-
| Loss
| align=center| 56–14–5
| Vladimir Matyushenko
| Submission (neck crank)
| IFC: Fighters Revenge
| 
| align=center| 1
| align=center| 15:33
| Quebec, Canada
| 
|-
| Win
| align=center| 56–13–5
| Harry Moskowitz
| KO (punches)
| HOOKnSHOOT: Horizon
| 
| align=center| 1
| align=center| 2:00
| Evansville, Indiana, United States
| 
|-
| Win
| align=center| 55–13–5
| Kevin Burrell
| KO (punch)
| Submission Fighting Championships 5
| 
| align=center| 1
| align=center| 0:06
| Belleville, Illinois, United States
| 
|-
| Win
| align=center| 54–13–5
| Tommy Graham
| Submission (armbar)
| HOOKnSHOOT: Trial
| 
| align=center| 1
| align=center| 2:45
| Evansville, Indiana, United States
| 
|-
| Win
| align=center| 53–13–5
| Barrett Banks
| KO (punch)
| Extreme Boxing 1
| 
| align=center| 1
| align=center| 0:38
| Davenport, Iowa, United States
| 
|-
| Win
| align=center| 52–13–5
| John Dixson
| Submission (armbar)
| IFC: Extreme Combat
| 
| align=center| 1
| align=center| 0:39
| Montreal, Quebec, Canada
|  
|-
| Win
| align=center| 51–13–5
| Peter McLeod
| Submission (armbar)
| IFC: Extreme Combat
| 
| align=center| 1
| align=center| 5:00
| Montreal, Quebec, Canada
| 
|-
| Win
| align=center| 50–13–5
| Wade Hamilton
| Submission (rear-naked choke)
| IFC: Extreme Combat
| 
| align=center| 1
| align=center| 1:22
| Montreal, Quebec, Canada
|  
|-
| Loss
| align=center| 49–13–5
| George Allen
| DQ
| New Year's Eve Knockout 1
| 
| align=center| 1
| align=center| N/A
| Atlanta, Georgia, United States
| 
|-
| Win
| align=center| 49–12–5
| Jeremy Bullock
| KO (slam)
| Extreme Challenge 22
| 
| align=center| 1
| align=center| 0:44
| West Valley City, Utah, United States
| 
|-
| Loss
| align=center| 48–12–5
| Neddie Noah
| Submission (rear-naked choke)
| Circuito Brasileiro de Vale Tudo 4
| 
| align=center| 1
| align=center| 10:36
| Brazil
| 
|-
| Win
| align=center| 48–11–5
| David Giannotti
| TKO (Submission to punches)
| HOOKnSHOOT: Eruption
| 
| align=center| 1
| align=center| 2:20
| Evansville, Indiana, United States
| 
|-
| Draw
| align=center| 47–11–5
| Joe Geromiller
| Draw
| Submission Fighting Championships 4
| 
| align=center| 1
| align=center| 14:00
| Carbondale, Illinois, United States
| 
|-
| Win
| align=center| 47–11–4
| Luiz Claudio Nunes
| TKO (punches)
| World Vale Tudo Championship 6
| 
| align=center| 1
| align=center| 1:53
| Brazil
|  
|-
| Win
| align=center| 46–11–4
| Augusto Ferreira
| TKO (Submission to punches)
| World Vale Tudo Championship 6
| 
| align=center| 1
| align=center| 7:06
| Brazil
|  
|-
| Win
| align=center| 45–11–4
| Alex Cerqueira
| TKO (Submission to punches)
| World Vale Tudo Championship 6
| 
| align=center| 1
| align=center| 2:18
| Brazil
| 
|-
| Win
| align=center| 44–11–4
| Tommy Sauer
| TKO (Submission to punches)
| Extreme Challenge 21
| 
| align=center| 1
| align=center| 1:57
| Hayward, Wisconsin, United States
| 
|-
| Draw
| align=center| 43–11–4
| Ikuhisa Minowa
| Draw
| Pancrase - Advance 9
| 
| align=center| 2
| align=center| 3:00
| Tokyo, Japan
| 
|-
| Win
| align=center| 43–11–3
| Albert Newberry
| Submission (armbar)
| Southern Iowa Ultimate Fighting 2
| 
| align=center| 1
| align=center| 2:48
| Iowa, United States
| 
|-
| Win
| align=center| 42–11–3
| Robby Ruby
| Submission (armbar)
| Southern Iowa Ultimate Fighting 2
| 
| align=center| 1
| align=center| 1:38
| Iowa, United States
| 
|-
| Draw
| align=center| 41–11–3
| Larry Parker
| Draw
| Extreme Challenge 20
| 
| align=center| 1
| align=center| 15:00
| Davenport, Iowa, United States
| 
|-
| Loss
| align=center| 41–11–2
| Gabriel Ulbegi
| Decision (unanimous)
| HOOKnSHOOT: Quest
| 
| align=center| 1
| align=center| 30:00
| 
| 
|-
| Win
| align=center| 41–10–2
| David Pa'aluhi
| Technical Submission (triangle armbar)
| SuperBrawl 8
| 
| align=center| 1
| align=center| 1:47
| Honolulu, Hawaii, United States
| 
|-
| Win
| align=center| 40–10–2
| Felix Mitchell
| KO (punches)
| Midwest Fighting 1
| 
| align=center| 1
| align=center| 4:25
| 
| 
|-
| Win
| align=center| 39–10–2
| Davey Conger
| Submission (rear-naked choke)
| Midwest Fighting 1
| 
| align=center| 1
| align=center| 1:00
| 
| 
|-
| Loss
| align=center| 38–10–2
| Faith Ulbegi 
| Decision (unanimous)
| Cage Combat 3
| 
| align=center| 1
| align=center| 15:00
| Ontario, California, United States
| 
|-
| Win
| align=center| 38–9–2
| Dave DeRosa
| Submission (triangle choke)
| Cage Combat 3
| 
| align=center| 1
| align=center| 9:08
| Cleveland, Ohio, United States
| 
|-
| Win
| align=center| 37–9–2
| Devin Love
| Submission (rear-naked choke)
| Cage Combat 3
| 
| align=center| 1
| align=center| 0:26
| Cleveland, Ohio, United States
| 
|-
| Win
| align=center| 36–9–2
| Mike Johnson
| Submission (armbar)
| Southern Iowa Ultimate Fighting 1
| 
| align=center| 1
| align=center| 0:10
| Iowa, United States
| 
|-
| Win
| align=center| 35–9–2
| Marvin Jones
| TKO (Submission to punches)
| Southern Iowa Ultimate Fighting 1
| 
| align=center| 1
| align=center| 2:11
| Iowa, United States
| 
|-
| Win
| align=center| 34–9–2
| Brad Anderson
| Submission (triangle armbar)
| IFC 8: Showdown at Shooting Star
| 
| align=center| 1
| align=center| 2:56
| Mahnomen, Minnesota, United States
|  
|-
| Win
| align=center| 33–9–2
| George Allen
| KO (elbows)
| IFC 8: Showdown at Shooting Star
| 
| align=center| 1
| align=center| 3:17
| Mahnomen, Minnesota, United States
| 
|-
| Win
| align=center| 32–9–2
| Guy Hinton
| Submission (armbar)
| Kombat Zone 1
| 
| align=center| 1
| align=center| 1:36
| Indiana, United States
| 
|-
| Win
| align=center| 31–9–2
| Eric Hill
| Submission (triangle choke)
| IFC 7: Cage Combat
| 
| align=center| 1
| align=center| 6:49
| Quebec, Canada
| 
|-
| Win
| align=center| 30–9–2
| Jaymon Hotz
| Submission (triangle armbar)
| Extreme Challenge 18
| 
| align=center| 1
| align=center| 1:57
| Davenport, Iowa, United States
| 
|-
| Win
| align=center| 29–9–2
| Jeremy Morrison
| TKO (Submission to punches)
| Fearless Freestyle Fighting 2
| 
| align=center| 1
| align=center| 1:19
| 
| 
|-
| Win
| align=center| 28–9–2
| Jason Lautzenheiser
| Submission (rear-naked choke)
| Fearless Freestyle Fighting 2
| 
| align=center| 1
| align=center| 0:44
| 
| 
|-
| Loss
| align=center| 27–9–2
| Dan Severn
| Submission (americana)
| Gladiators 2
| 
| align=center| 1
| align=center| 10:39
| 
| 
|-
| Win
| align=center| 27–8–2
| Clayton Miller
| Submission (armbar)
| Iowa Vale Tudo Championships 3
| 
| align=center| 1
| align=center| 2:20
| Iowa, United States
| 
|-
| Win
| align=center| 26–8–2
| Jason Powers
| Submission (triangle choke)
| Iowa Vale Tudo Championships 3
| 
| align=center| 1
| align=center| 0:51
| Iowa, United States
| 
|-
| Draw
| align=center| 25–8–2
| Jeremy Horn
| Draw
| Extreme Challenge 16
| 
| align=center| 1
| align=center| 20:00
| Iowa, United States
| 
|-
| Win
| align=center| 25–8–1
| Jason Powers
| TKO (Submission to punches)
| Iowa Vale Tudo Championships 2
| 
| align=center| 1
| align=center| 0:22
| Iowa, United States
| 
|-
| Win
| align=center| 24–8–1
| Bob Waters
| Submission (armbar)
| Iowa Vale Tudo Championships 2
| 
| align=center| 1
| align=center| 2:00
| Iowa, United States
| 
|-
| Win
| align=center| 23–8–1
| Courtney Turner
| TKO (Submission to punches)
| RnB 2: Bare Knuckle Brawl
| 
| align=center| 1
| align=center| 1:16
| Atlanta, Georgia, United States
| 
|-
| Win
| align=center| 22–8–1
| Sam Adkins
| Submission (armbar)
| RnB 2: Bare Knuckle Brawl
| 
| align=center| 1
| align=center| 0:45
| Atlanta, Georgia, United States
| 
|-
| Win
| align=center| 21–8–1
| Jamie Schell
| Submission (armbar)
| RnB 2: Bare Knuckle Brawl
| 
| align=center| 1
| align=center| 0:36
| Atlanta, Georgia, United States
| 
|-
| Win
| align=center| 20–8–1
| Greg Ford
| Submission (rear-naked choke)
| Extreme Challenge 14
| 
| align=center| 1
| align=center| 1:40
| Hammond, Indiana, United States
| 
|-
| Loss
| align=center| 19–8–1
| Jim Czajkowski
| Submission (choke)
| Extreme Challenge 13
| 
| align=center| 1
| align=center| 2:33
| Kenosha, Wisconsin, United States
| 
|-
| Win
| align=center| 19–7–1
| Jim Theobald
| Submission (armbar)
| Extreme Challenge 13
| 
| align=center| 1
| align=center| 3:48
| Kenosha, Wisconsin, United States
| 
|-
| Win
| align=center| 18–7–1
| Andy Schmidt
| TKO (Submission to punches)
| Iowa Vale Tudo Championships 1
| 
| align=center| 1
| align=center| 0:43
| Iowa, United States
| 
|-
| Win
| align=center| 17–7–1
| Ben Pearce
| TKO (Submission to punches)
| Iowa Vale Tudo Championships 1
| 
| align=center| 1
| align=center| 0:47
| Iowa, United States
| 
|-
| Loss
| align=center| 16–7–1
| Noe Hernandez
| Decision (unanimous)
| Extreme Challenge 12
| 
| align=center| 1
| align=center| 20:00
| Kalamazoo, Michigan, United States
| 
|-
| Win
| align=center| 16–6–1
| Eddie Moore
| Submission (rear-naked choke)
| Extreme Challenge 12
| 
| align=center| 1
| align=center| 6:23
| Kalamazoo, Michigan, United States
| 
|-
| Win
| align=center| 15–6–1
| Mike Delaney
| Submission (guillotine choke)
| Extreme Challenge 11
| 
| align=center| 1
| align=center| 2:10
| Marshalltown, Iowa, United States
| 
|-
| Win
| align=center| 14–6–1
| Bob Magee
| Submission (armbar)
| Extreme Challenge 10
| 
| align=center| 1
| align=center| 1:00
| Des Moines, Iowa, United States
| 
|-
| Loss
| align=center| 13–6–1
| Matt Lindland
| Submission (choke)
| IFC 6: Battle at Four Bears
| 
| align=center| 1
| align=center| 22:13
| New Town, North Dakota, United States
|  
|-
| Win
| align=center| 13–5–1
| Paul Moller
| KO (punch)
| IFC 6: Battle at Four Bears
| 
| align=center| 1
| align=center| 0:14
| New Town, North Dakota, United States
| 
|-
| Win
| align=center| 12–5–1
| Clayton Miller
| Submission (triangle choke)
| Iowa Extreme Fighting 1
| 
| align=center| 1
| align=center| 0:51
| Iowa, United States
| 
|-
| Win
| align=center| 11–5–1
| Dan Croonquist
| Submission (neck crank)
| Iowa Extreme Fighting 1
| 
| align=center| 1
| align=center| 2:22
| Iowa, United States
| 
|-
| Win
| align=center| 10–5–1
| Ben Smaldino
| Submission (armbar)
| Iowa Extreme Fighting 1
| 
| align=center| 1
| align=center| 0:47
| Iowa, United States
| 
|-
| Draw
| align=center| 9–5–1
| Jeremy Horn
| Draw
| Extreme Challenge 9
| 
| align=center| 1
| align=center| 15:00
| Davenport, Iowa, United States
| 
|-
| Win
| align=center| 9–5
| Dennis Reed
| Submission (triangle choke)
| Extreme Challenge 8
| 
| align=center| 1
| align=center| 5:19
| Iowa, United States
| 
|-
| Loss
| align=center| 8–5
| Brad Kohler
| TKO (Submission to punches)
| HOOKnSHOOT: Absolute Fighting Championship 2
| 
| align=center| 1
| align=center| 52:24
| 
| 
|-
| Win
| align=center| 8–4
| Dennis Reed
| KO (punch)
| Extreme Challenge 7
| 
| align=center| 1
| align=center| 0:33
| Council Bluffs, Iowa, United States
| 
|-
| Win
| align=center| 7–4
| Matt Andersen
| TKO (Submission to punches)
| Extreme Challenge 7
| 
| align=center| 1
| align=center| 3:43
| Council Bluffs, Iowa, United States
| 
|-
| Win
| align=center| 6–4
| Dan Croonquist
| Submission (americana)
| Ultimate Enticer
| 
| align=center| 1
| align=center| 1:11
| Evansdale, Iowa, United States
| 
|-
| Win
| align=center| 5–4
| August Porquet
| TKO (punches)
| Extreme Challenge 6
| 
| align=center| 1
| align=center| 4:21
| Battle Creek, Michigan, United States
| 
|-
| Loss
| align=center| 4–4
| Brian Dunn
| Decision (unanimous)
| Extreme Challenge 5
| 
| align=center| 1
| align=center| 15:00
| Waterloo, Iowa, United States
| 
|-
| Win
| align=center| 4–3
| Angelo Rivera
| TKO (punches)
| Extreme Challenge 5
| 
| align=center| 1
| align=center| 1:36
| Waterloo, Iowa, United States
| 
|-
| Loss
| align=center| 3–3
| Ryan Jensen
| Submission (triangle choke)
| Extreme Challenge 4
| 
| align=center| 1
| align=center| 1:40
| Council Bluffs, Iowa, United States
| 
|-
| Win
| align=center| 3–2
| Dan Croonquist
| Submission (armbar)
| Extreme Challenge 3
| 
| align=center| 1
| align=center| 0:50
| Davenport, Iowa, United States
| 
|-
| Loss
| align=center| 2–2
| Scott Morton
| Submission (triangle choke)
| Extreme Challenge 2
| 
| align=center| 1
| align=center| 1:46
| Des Moines, Iowa, United States
| 
|-
| Win
| align=center| 2–1
| Clayton Miller
| KO (punches and elbows)
| Extreme Challenge 1
| 
| align=center| 1
| align=center| 3:09
| Des Moines, Iowa, United States
| 
|-
| Win
| align=center| 1–1
| Wesley Jamieson
| Submission (guillotine choke)
| Brawl at the Ballpark 1
| 
| align=center| 1
| align=center| 4:16
| Davenport, Iowa, United States
| 
|-
| Loss
| align=center| 0–1
| Dave Strasser
| Submission (rear-naked choke)
| Gladiators 1
| 
| align=center| 1
| align=center| 3:07
| Davenport, Iowa, United States
|

Professional boxing record

|-
| align="center" style="border-style: none none solid solid; background: #e3e3e3"|Result
| align="center" style="border-style: none none solid solid; background: #e3e3e3"|Record
| align="center" style="border-style: none none solid solid; background: #e3e3e3"|Opponent
| align="center" style="border-style: none none solid solid; background: #e3e3e3"|Type
| align="center" style="border-style: none none solid solid; background: #e3e3e3"|Round
| align="center" style="border-style: none none solid solid; background: #e3e3e3"|Date
| align="center" style="border-style: none none solid solid; background: #e3e3e3"|Location
| align="center" style="border-style: none none solid solid; background: #e3e3e3"|Notes
|-align=center
|Loss
|align=left|
|align=left| Ryan Watson
|align=left|UD
|align=left|4
|09/08/2019
|align=left| Hinckley, Minnesota, United States
|align=left|
|-align=center
|Loss
|align=left|
|align=left| Mladen Miljas
|align=left|TKO
|align=left|1
|08/09/2018
|align=left| Lawrence, Kansas, United States
|align=left|
|-align=center
|Loss
|align=left|
|align=left| David Latoria 
|align=left|UD
|align=left|4
|15/09/2017
|align=left| Rosemont, Illinois, United States
|align=left|
|-align=center
| Win 
|align=left|
|align=left| Preston Shane
|align=left|KO
|align=left|1
|15/07/2017
|align=left| Waterloo, Iowa, United States
|align=left|
|-align=center
|style="background: #c5d2ea"|Draw
|align=left|
|align=left| Lance Gauch
|align=left|MD
|align=left|4
|29/04/2017
|align=left| Lawrence, Kansas, United States
|align=left|
|-align=center
|Loss
|align=left|
|align=left| Tyson Cobb
|align=left|KO
|align=left|1
|29/04/2017
|align=left| Lawrence, Kansas, United States
|align=left|
|-align=center
|Loss
|align=left|
|align=left| Craig Lewis
|align=left|TKO
|align=left|1
|07/10/2016
|align=left| Covington, Kentucky, United States
|align=left|
|-align=center
|Win 
|align=left|
|align=left| Mike Smith
|align=left|TKO
|align=left|1
|24/09/2016
|align=left| Mason City, Iowa, United States
|align=left|
|-align=center
|Loss
|align=left|
|align=left| Byron Polley
|align=left|DQ
|align=left|3
|10/06/2016
|align=left| Saint Joseph, Missouri, United States
|align=left|
|-align=center
|Loss
|align=left|
|align=left| Simon Kean
|align=left|TKO
|align=left|2
|12/03/2016
|align=left| Montreal, Quebec, Canada
|align=left|
|-align=center
|Loss
|align=left|
|align=left| Richard Carmack
|align=left|UD
|align=left|4
|19/02/2016
|align=left| Sloan, Iowa, United States
|align=left|
|-align=center
|Win
|align=left|
|align=left| Van Goodman
|align=left|UD
|align=left|5
|22/01/2016
|align=left| Hinckley, Minnesota, United States
|align=left|
|-align=center
|Loss
|align=left|
|align=left| Oleksandr Teslenko
|align=left|DQ
|align=left|2
|28/11/2015
|align=left| Dartmouth, Nova Scotia, Canada
|align=left|
|-align=center
|Loss
|align=left|
|align=left| Joey Abell 
|align=left|TKO
|align=left|3
|17/04/2015
|align=left| Hinckley, Minnesota, United States
|align=left|
|-align=center
|Loss
|align=left|
|align=left| Byron Polley
|align=left|SD
|align=left|4
|28/03/2015
|align=left| Saint Joseph, Missouri, United States
|align=left|
|-align=center
|Win
|align=left|
|align=left| Blake Breitsprecher
|align=left|TKO
|align=left|2
|02/08/2014
|align=left| Waterloo, Iowa, United States
|align=left|
|-align=center
|Loss
|align=left|
|align=left| Ed Latimore
|align=left|DQ
|align=left|2
|17/05/2014
|align=left| Chester, West Virginia, United States
|align=left|
|-align=center
|Loss
|align=left|
|align=left| Donovan Dennis
|align=left|TKO
|align=left|2
|28/03/2014
|align=left| New Town, North Dakota, United States
|align=left|
|-align=center
|Loss
|align=left|
|align=left| Lenroy Thomas
|align=left|UD
|align=left|4
|21/03/2014
|align=left| Tampa, Florida, United States
|align=left|
|-align=center
|Loss
|align=left|
|align=left| Lateef Kayode
|align=left|TKO
|align=left|2
|06/12/2013
|align=left| Santa Ynez, California, United States
|align=left|
|-align=center
|Loss
|align=left|
|align=left| Gerald Washington
|align=left|TKO
|align=left|1
|19/10/2013
|align=left| Mexico City, Mexico
|align=left|
|-align=center
|Win
|align=left|
|align=left| Van Goodman
|align=left|UD
|align=left|4
|16/08/2013
|align=left| Hinckley, Minnesota, United States
|align=left|
|-align=center
|Win
|align=left|
|align=left| Blake Breitsprecher
|align=left|TKO
|align=left|3
|27/07/2013
|align=left| Des Moines, Iowa, United States
|align=left|
|-align=center
|Loss
|align=left|
|align=left| Jeremy Williams
|align=left|DQ
|align=left|3
|30/03/2013
|align=left| Waterloo, Iowa, United States
|align=left|
|-align=center
|style="background: #c5d2ea"|Draw
|align=left|
|align=left| Van Goodman 
|align=left|MD
|align=left|4
|25/01/2013
|align=left| Hinckley, Minnesota, United States
|align=left|
|-align=center
|Win
|align=left|
|align=left| Mike Smith
|align=left|KO
|align=left|1
|15/12/2012
|align=left| Waterloo, Iowa, United States
|align=left|
|-align=center
|Loss
|align=left|
|align=left| Jordan Shimmell
|align=left|TKO
|align=left|2
|27/10/2012
|align=left| Carlton, Minnesota, United States
|align=left|
|-
|Win
|
|align=left| Sam Wilcox
|TKO
|1
|08/09/2012
|align=left| Davenport, Iowa, United States
|align=left|
|-
|Loss
|
|align=left| Elijah McCall
|TKO
|2
|21/06/2012
|align=left| Elk Grove, Illinois, United States
|align=left|
|-
|Win
|
|align=left| Nick Capes
|TKO
|1
|02/06/2012
|align=left| Davenport, Iowa, United States
|align=left|
|-
|Loss
|
|align=left| Galen Brown
|UD
|4
|12/05/2012
|align=left| Concho, Oklahoma, United States
|align=left|
|-
|Loss
|
|align=left| Aaron Green
|TKO
|2
|07/04/2012
|align=left| Superior, Wisconsin, United States
|align=left|
|-
|Win
|
|align=left| Preston Shane
|KO
|2
|10/03/2012
|align=left| Waterloo, Iowa, United States
|align=left|
|-
|Loss
|
|align=left| Fres Oquendo
|DQ
|2
|03/03/2012
|align=left| Davenport, Iowa, United States
|align=left|
|-
|Win
|
|align=left| Brian Long
|KO
|1
|18/02/2012
|align=left| Steamboat Rock, Iowa, United States
|align=left|
|-
|Loss
|
|align=left| Eugene Hill
|UD
|4
|10/06/2011
|align=left| Iowa City, Iowa, United States
|align=left|
|-
|Loss
|
|align=left| Rob Calloway
|MD
|6
|06/08/2011
|align=left| Kansas City, Kansas, United States
|align=left|
|-
|Loss
|
|align=left| John Clark
|TKO
|3
|07/05/2009
|align=left| Tulsa, Oklahoma, United States
|align=left|
|-
|Loss
|
|align=left| Chazz Witherspoon
|TKO
|3
|28/03/2009
|align=left| Miami, Oklahoma, United States
|align=left|
|-
|Loss
|
|align=left| Raphael Butler
|TKO
|2
|04/10/2008
|align=left| Rochester, Minnesota, United States
|align=left|
|-
|Loss
|
|align=left| Travis Kauffman
|TKO
|2
|19/07/2008
|align=left| Saint Joseph, Missouri, United States
|align=left|
|-
|Loss
|
|align=left| Galen Brown
|UD
|6
|17/05/2008
|align=left| Saint Joseph, Missouri, United States
|align=left|
|-
|Loss
|
|align=left| Steve Collins
|UD
|4
|02/08/2007
|align=left| Houston, Texas, United States
|align=left|
|-
|Loss
|
|align=left| Raphael Butler
|TKO
|2
|29/06/2007
|align=left| Comstock Park, Michigan, United States
|align=left|
|-
|Loss
|
|align=left| Lou Savarese
|TKO
|3
|18/01/2007
|align=left| Houston, Texas, United States
|align=left|
|-
|Loss
|
|align=left| Patrice L'Heureux
|TKO
|3
|30/09/2006
|align=left| Montreal, Quebec, Canada
|align=left|
|-
|Win
|
|align=left| Rory Prazak
|TKO
|2
|15/07/2006
|align=left| Manchester, Iowa, United States
|align=left|
|-
|Loss
|
|align=left| Alonzo Butler
|TKO
|2
|31/05/2006
|align=left| Airway Heights, Washington, United States
|align=left|
|-
|Loss
|
|align=left| Travis Walker
|TKO
|2
|23/02/2006
|align=left| Lemoore, California, United States
|align=left|
|-
|Win
|
|align=left| Brandon Quigley
|TKO
|1
|28/01/2006
|align=left| Hendrick, Iowa, United States
|align=left|
|-
|Win
|
|align=left| Bryan Robinson
|TKO
|1
|10/12/2005
|align=left| Blairstown, Iowa, United States
|align=left|
|-
|Loss
|
|align=left| Chauncy Welliver
|TKO
|4
|17/09/2005
|align=left| Tacoma, Washington, United States
|align=left|
|-
|Loss
|
|align=left| Jeremy Bates
|TKO
|1
|12/08/2005
|align=left| Wheeling, West Virginia, United States
|align=left|
|-
|Loss
|
|align=left| Thomas Hayes
|TKO
|3
|08/07/2005
|align=left| Merrillville, Indiana, United States
|align=left|
|-
|Loss
|
|align=left| China "The Dragon" Smith
|TKO
|3
|03/06/2005
|align=left| Sarasota, Florida, United States
|align=left|
|-
|Win
|
|align=left| Rory Prazak
|KO
|2
|07/05/2005
|align=left| Duluth, Minnesota, United States
|align=left|
|-
|Loss
|
|align=left| Albert Sosnowski
|TKO
|2
|19/03/2005
|align=left| Las Vegas, Nevada, United States
|align=left|
|-
|Loss
|
|align=left| Rob Calloway
|TKO
|2
|05/02/2005
|align=left| Omaha, Nebraska, United States
|align=left|
|-
|Win
|
|align=left| Don Shea
|KO
|1
|22/01/2005
|align=left| Hendrick, Iowa, United States
|align=left|
|-
|Win
|
|align=left| Rory Prazak
|TKO
|2
|17/12/2004
|align=left| Clive, Iowa, United States
|align=left|
|-
|Loss
|
|align=left| David Rodriguez
|TKO
|1
|22/10/2004
|align=left| El Paso, Texas, United States
|align=left|
|-
|Win
|
|align=left| Brandon Quigley
|TKO
|1
|16/10/2004
|align=left| Waterloo, Iowa, United States
|align=left|
|-
|Win
|
|align=left| Bryan Robinson
|KO
|2
|30/09/2004
|align=left| Altoona, Iowa, United States
|align=left|
|-
|Loss
|
|align=left| Brian Minto
|TKO
|2
|24/06/2004
|align=left| Niles, Ohio, United States
|align=left|
|-
|Loss
|
|align=left| Chris Koval
|TKO
|1
|23/04/2004
|align=left| Wheeling, West Virginia, United States
|align=left|
|-
|Win
|
|align=left| Manuel Quiroz
|TKO
|1
|28/02/2004
|align=left| Marshalltown, Iowa, United States
|align=left|
|-
|Loss
|
|align=left| John Poore
|TKO
|1
|11/11/2003
|align=left| Philadelphia, Pennsylvania, United States
|align=left|
|-
|Win
|
|align=left| Bryan Robinson
|TKO
|2
|10/10/2003
|align=left| Osceola, Iowa, United States
|align=left|
|-
|Win
|
|align=left| Kevin Oliver
|TKO
|1
|15/06/2002
|align=left| Waterloo, Iowa, United States
|align=left|
|-
|Win
|
|align=left| Clayton Miller
|TKO
|2
|11/05/2002
|align=left| Marshalltown, Iowa, United States
|align=left|
|-
|Loss
|
|align=left| Simon Welms Nielsen
|TKO
|1
|31/03/2000
|align=left| Esbjerg, Denmark
|align=left|
|-
|Loss
|
|align=left| Tye Fields
|KO
|1
|17/02/2000
|align=left| Davenport, Iowa, United States
|align=left|
|-
|Win
|
|align=left| Jesse Villagecenter
|TKO
|2
|07/10/1999
|align=left| Rochester, Minnesota, United States
|align=left|
|-
|Loss
|
|align=left| Jesse Villagecenter
|KO
|2
|24/07/1999
|align=left| Mahnomen, Minnesota, United States
|align=left|
|-
|Win
|
|align=left| Jamie Schell
|KO
|1
|17/02/1999
|align=left| Davenport, Iowa, United States
|align=left|
|}

Bare-knuckle boxing record

|-
| align="center" style="border-style: none none solid solid; background: #e3e3e3"|Result
| align="center" style="border-style: none none solid solid; background: #e3e3e3"|Record
| align="center" style="border-style: none none solid solid; background: #e3e3e3"|Opponent
| align="center" style="border-style: none none solid solid; background: #e3e3e3"|Type
| align="center" style="border-style: none none solid solid; background: #e3e3e3"|Round
| align="center" style="border-style: none none solid solid; background: #e3e3e3"|Date
| align="center" style="border-style: none none solid solid; background: #e3e3e3"|Location
| align="center" style="border-style: none none solid solid; background: #e3e3e3"|Notes
|-align=center
|Loss
|align=left|
|align=left| Michael P. Gruis
|align=left|TKO
|align=left|3
|30/11/2019
|align=left| Topeka, Kansas, United States
|align=left|
|}

See also
 List of male mixed martial artists

References

External links

1977 births
2021 deaths
American male mixed martial artists
Mixed martial artists from Iowa
Boxers from Iowa
Heavyweight mixed martial artists
Heavyweight boxers
American male kickboxers
Heavyweight kickboxers
American male karateka
American submission wrestlers
Mixed martial artists utilizing American Kenpo
Mixed martial artists utilizing boxing
Mixed martial artists utilizing wrestling
People from Cedar Falls, Iowa
People from Black Hawk County, Iowa
Sportspeople from Waterloo, Iowa
American male boxers
Ultimate Fighting Championship male fighters